The September 15, 2007 anti-war protest was a march from the White House to the United States Capitol.  It was organized by Veterans for Peace and the ANSWER Coalition. Volunteers were recruited for a civil disobedience action, which included a die-in. Volunteers signed up to take on the name of a soldier or civilian who died because of the war, and lay down around the Peace Monument. In attendance were public figures such as Cindy Sheehan and Ralph Nader. Police arrested more than 190 demonstrators who crossed police lines in front of the Capitol. Chemical spray was used by Capitol Police.

The protest march started near the White House in Lafayette Park where many protesters raised placards to show their disapproval of the war and to demand impeachment of the President for war crimes.  One father brought a flag-draped coffin, as a memorial to his son who was killed in Iraq.  The parent placed the coffin near the fence at the White House expressing President Bush's culpability in the deaths of U.S. troops who have died in Iraq.  Other signs were raised proclaiming that the U.S. occupation of Iraq is illegal and that U.S. troops should be supported by bringing them home.

Organizers estimated that nearly 100,000 people attended the rally and march. That number could not be confirmed; police did not give their own estimate. Associated press reported "several thousand." A permit for the march obtained in advance by the ANSWER Coalition had projected 10,000. Independent aerial photography and crowd counting firm AirPhotosLive was commissioned by ANSWER Coalition organizers and measured attendance at 1 pm to be  74,000 - with a margin of error of 8,000.

The demonstration was met with a counter-demonstration of the Gathering of Eagles organization and Free Republic, which had also counter-protested anti-war protesters during the March 17, 2007 anti-war protest.

Legal issues 
The DC Department of Public Works levied a $10,000-fine against ANSWER for violating city ordinances by putting signs on utility boxes and using an adhesive that was difficult to remove.  Additionally, the National Park Service, which administers many of the parks in the District of Columbia, stated that the signs are defacement of federal property and ordered the group to remove the signs or pay for their removal.  ANSWER refused to pay the fines or remove the signs saying that the city's actions are "politically motivated." ANSWER sued the city in federal court to stop the city from enforcing its laws until it creates a "constitutionally allowable and non-discriminating system" for determining the rules on sign posting. An ANSWER spokeswoman stated that they gained support from the publicity and intended to continue to post more and more posters, stickers, and banners despite the efforts of the city.

See also 

Protests against the Iraq War

References

External links 

Protests against the Iraq War
Protest marches in Washington, D.C.
Peace marches
2007 in American politics
2007 in Washington, D.C.
2007 protests
[Category:September 2007 events in the United States]]